The Treaty of Den Haag (also known as the Treaty of The Hague) was signed on 16 May 1895. The accord established the borders of British New Guinea.

References

External links
Chronology: Significant Dates in Irian/New Guinea History.
Treaty text

Hague
hague
Hague
Treaties extended to the Territory of Papua
Indonesia–Papua New Guinea border
19th century in The Hague